Sergio Bassi (23 June 1949 – 15 March 2020) was an Italian folk singer-songwriter.

Biography
Sergio was raised by his maternal grandparents in a small hamlet in Codogno, Lombardy. After adulthood, he moved to Legnano, later to Piacenza, then he lived in San Francesco al Campo for seven years. Later, he returned to his hometown.

During the COVID-19 pandemic in Italy, he contracted novel coronavirus. He died from the infection in Crema on 15 March 2020.

Discography

Single
 1982 – Una città su misura (45 GIRI) 
 2011 – Il Mantovano Volante (CD AUDIO) Museo Tazio Nuvolari
 2016 – Inno a Santa Francesca Cabrini  (CD AUDIO)

Album
 1984 – Fermati Guerriero 
 1985 – Ali per volare
 1986 – Cambio di stagioni
 1989 – L'Equilibrista  (prima versione LP 33 giri)
 1993 – Storie Padane & non... (prima versione in cassetta non-pubblicata)
 2003 – Storie padane & non...
 2004 – L'Equilibrista
 2006 – E Il fiume sta a guardare...
 2007 – Cavallo Pazzo
 2011 – I Cieli della Terra
 2015 – Identità Musica & Parole
 2017 – Una zolla di terra – Antologia

References

External links 
Sito ufficiale 
I video di Sergio Bassi su Youtube 
Vi racconto il mio rock fra terre del Po e ballate popolari 
Sergio Bassi, un album del narratore di pianura fra la Bassa e il West 
 

1951 births
2020 deaths
Folk rock musicians
Italian singer-songwriters
People from Codogno
Deaths from the COVID-19 pandemic in Lombardy